The Sleepycat License (sometimes referred to as Berkeley Database License or the Sleepycat Public License) is a copyleft free software license used by Oracle Corporation for the open-source editions of Berkeley DB, Berkeley DB Java Edition and Berkeley DB XML embedded database products older than version 6.0.20. (Starting with version 6.0.20, the open-source editions are instead licensed under the GNU AGPL v3.)

The license is named after its original publisher Sleepycat Software, Inc., a company that was merged into Oracle in 2006.

See also 

 Comparison of free and open-source software licenses

References

External links 
 License
 Berkeley DB Paper
 Discussion on the potential of the license at libreplanet-discuss mailing list

Free and open-source software licenses
Copyleft software licenses